Harris Michael Johnston Andrews (born 11 December 1996) is an Australian rules footballer and the co-captain of the Brisbane Lions in the Australian Football League (AFL).

Early life
Andrews was born in Fitzroy, Melbourne in 1996. He moved to Brisbane with his family in 2000 at the age of 4. There he participated in the Auskick program at Aspley and began playing junior football for the Aspley Football Club at five years of age. He attended Padua College throughout his schooling and was recruited to the Brisbane Lions development academy as a 17 year old. In 2013, Andrews was the leading goal kicker in the NEAFL under 18 competition, with 80 goals in 17 games. In 2014, Andrews played as a key position defender while representing Queensland in the TAC Cup and the 2014 AFL Under 18 Championships. The Brisbane Lions selected him with the 61st pick at the 2014 AFL draft.

AFL career

Andrews played his first game in round 3 of the 2015 season against , scoring a debut goal from more than 50 metres. He was nominated for Nab Rising Star Nominee in Round 18. He was included in the AFL 22 under 22 Team 2017/2018 and named Captain in 2019. Andrews was voted Most Professional Player Brisbane Lions 2017–2020. In May 2018, Andrews was appointed vice-captain of the Lions.

Statistics
Updated to the end of the 2022 season.

|-
| 2015 ||  || 31
| 19 || 4 || 2 || 118 || 103 || 221 || 100 || 28 || 0.2 || 0.1 || 6.2 || 5.34 || 11.6 || 5.3 || 1.5 || 0
|- 
| 2016 ||  || 31
| 17 || 2 || 1 || 98 || 77 || 175 || 72 || 38 || 0.1 || 0.1 || 5.8 || 4.5 || 10.3 || 4.2 || 2.2 || 0
|-
| 2017 ||  || 31
| 22 || 2 || 0 || 170 || 116 || 286 || 138 || 22 || 0.1 || 0.0 || 7.7 || 5.3 || 13.0 || 6.3 || 1.0 || 0
|- 
| 2018 ||  || 31
| 18 || 1 || 1 || 168 || 113 || 281 || 119 || 39 || 0.1 || 0.1 || 9.3 || 6.3 || 15.6 || 6.6 || 2.2 || 2
|-
| 2019 ||  || 31
| 21 || 0 || 0 || 163 || 106 || 269 || 116 || 33 || 0.0 || 0.0 || 7.8 || 5.0 || 12.8 || 5.5 || 1.6 || 2
|-
| 2020 ||  || 31
| 16 || 0 || 0 || 113 || 58 || 171 || 71 || 17 || 0.0 || 0.0 || 7.1 || 3.6 || 10.7 || 4.4 || 1.1 || 4
|-
| 2021 ||  || 31
| 23 || 1 || 1 || 219 || 132 || 351 || style="background:#CAE1FF; width:1em" | 181† || 29 || 0.0 || 0.0 || 9.5 || 5.7 || 15.3 || 7.9 || 1.1 || 0
|- 
| 2022 ||  || 31
| 24 || 0 || 0 || 208 || 93 || 301 || 154 || 29 || 0.0 || 0.0 || 8.6 || 3.8 || 12.5 || 6.4 || 1.2 || 0
|- class=sortbottom
! colspan=3 | Career
! 160 !! 10 !! 5 !! 1257 !! 798 !! 2055 !! 950 !! 235 !! 0.0 !! 0.0 !! 7.8 !! 4.9 !! 12.8 !! 5.9 !! 1.4 !! 8
|}

Notes

Honours and achievements
Individual
 2× All-Australian team: 2019, 2020
 All Stars Representative Honours in Bushfire Relief Match: 2020
 3× 22under22 team: 2017, 2018, 2019 (c)
 AFL Rising Star nominee: 2015 (round 18)

References

External links 

1996 births
Living people
Brisbane Lions players
Aspley Football Club players
Australian rules footballers from Queensland
People educated at Padua College (Brisbane)
All-Australians (AFL)
Sportspeople from Brisbane